Michael David Abràmoff (born 1963) is a Dutch-American ophthalmologist, computer scientist and entrepreneur. He is the Robert C. Watzke Professor of Ophthalmology and Visual Sciences at the Roy J. and Lucille A. Carver College of Medicine at the University of Iowa. He is the Founder and Executive Chairman of Digital Diagnostics (fka. IDx Technologies, Inc.), of Iowa City, called by Wired Magazine "the bolder AI company", and which received the first FDA marketing authorization for an autonomous diagnostic AI system in any field of medicine.

Early life and education
Abràmoff was born in Rotterdam, the Netherlands, and received his MD and MS (information theory) from the University of Amsterdam. He was a research fellow in the Neural Networks lab at RIKEN, Tokyo, Japan. He was Director of R&D at Prodix SA, an image analysis company in Paris, France. He performed his residency in ophthalmology at the University of Utrecht Academic Hospital, and his vitreoretinal fellowship at Vrije Universiteit in Amsterdam. He did his graduate research leading to a Ph.D. in medical image analysis at the University of Utrecht.

Medical career
Abràmoff is referred to as "The Retinator," a nickname given to him in an Ophthalmology Times article, referring to the work he has done on improving automated medical diagnostic algorithms. One of his keynote addresses was on the role autonomous AI can play in improving healthcare productivity for SPIE Medical Imaging.

Abràmoff is the author of over 300 peer-reviewed research articles, and his work has been cited over 37,000 times, leading to an h-index of 67 (Google Scholar). He is inventor on 19 US and international patents and patent applications primarily related to retinal imaging and machine learning. Abramoff was also one of the early developers of ImageJ.

On November 27, 2020, Dr. Abramoff was named in James Gardner's keynote address to the Societa' Oftalmologica Italiana, “Key Persons Who Have Advanced the Understanding of Diabetic Retinopathy.”

Business career
Abràmoff founded three companies, EyeCheck, a teleretinal diabetic retinopathy screening company in Amsterdam, the Netherlands, and i-Optics, an ophthalmic device company. In 2010, he founded IDx LLC, IDx, Technologies, Inc. now Digital Diagnostics of which he is currently Executive Chairman.

In March 2016, IDx announced an Alliance for Eye Health with IBM Watson. In January 2018 the results of its pivotal clinical trial for an AI-based autonomous system to detect diabetic retinopathy in primary care were submitted to FDA, exceeding its pre-specified superiority endpoints for diagnostic accuracy. FDA assigned it breakthrough device status for expedited review. He has been dubbed a "Renaissance Man" by Retina Physician  by creating a simple and more efficient process of analyzing images that is in the best interest of the patient. It received the first FDA marketing authorization for an autonomous diagnostic AI system in any field of medicine.

On October 25, 2017, in a Congressional Briefing sponsored by the Science Coalition, Abràmoff joined a panel of companies that, like Digital Diagnostics (fka IDx, Technologies), spun out of U.S. research universities. The panelists highlighted to lawmakers the value of putting federal funds toward academic research.

On November 13, 2018, Abràmoff was invited by the Federal Trade Commission to be a panelist for a hearing Understanding Algorithms, Artificial Intelligence, and Predictive Analytics Through Real World Applications. Abràmoff's panel explained how to do safe implementation of AI in medicine.

Personal life
Outside of the world of medicine and science, Abràmoff was an interviewer for Spielberg's Shoah Visual History Project. He contributed to the Vance Integral Edition.

Honors
 2020 University of Iowa Faculty/Staff Startup of the Year Award 
 2020 MedTech Breakthrough Award: Best New Technology Award - Diabetes Management
 2019 Fellow, Institute of Electrical and Electronics Engineers (IEEE)
 2019 CB Insights AI Top 100 list
 2019 America's Cultivation Corridor, Iowa Biotech Leader Award 
 2019 UI Carver College of Medicine Wall of Scholarship
 2019 Ophthalmologist Top 10 Powerlist of Top Inventors
 2018 Patent Award, University of Iowa Research Foundation
 2018 Fellow, Association for Research in Vision and Ophthalmology (ARVO)
 2016 Charles D. Phelps Memorial Award for Glaucoma Research  
 2013 Young Investigator Award, Macula Society  
 2011 President's Innovation Award, American Telemedicine Association  
 2003 PG Binkhorst Award, "Objective Measurement of Motion in the Orbit"  
 2001 New Venture  Award, McKinsey Inc. / Verbond Nederlandse Ondernemers,  Award for Best Business plan, Netherlands  
 2002 3M-Jonkers Award  
 1996 RSNA Cum Laude Award, Congress of the Radiological Society of North America  
 1991 Peter Reichertz Prize for best young researcher, European Federation for Medical Informatics

Selected publications

References

External links
Michael Abramoff at the Roy J. and Lucille A. Carver College of Medicine

American ophthalmologists
Dutch ophthalmologists
Dutch computer scientists
Dutch electrical engineers
Academic staff of Maastricht University
University of Amsterdam alumni
Utrecht University alumni
University of Iowa faculty
Senior Members of the IEEE
Living people
1963 births